Scott Hutchins (born 1974) is an American novelist and short story writer.

Biography
Scott Hutchins is an American novelist and short-story writer. A native of Arkansas, he was awarded a Stegner Fellowship from Stanford University. His work has appeared in StoryQuarterly, Five Chapters, The Owls, The Rumpus, The New York Times, San Francisco Magazine and Esquire Magazine. His debut novel A Working Theory of Love has been called both "revelatory and exciting" and "ambitious and accomplished." He currently holds a Jones Lectureship in Stanford's creative writing program.

Bibliography
A Working Theory of Love

References

External links

1974 births
Living people
21st-century American novelists
Stegner Fellows
American male novelists
American male short story writers
21st-century American short story writers
21st-century American male writers